Pēteris Zeltiņš (14 July 1914 – 9 November 1994) was a Latvian racewalker who competed for the Soviet Union in the 1952 Summer Olympics.

References

External links 
 
 

1914 births
1994 deaths
Soviet male racewalkers
Latvian male racewalkers
Olympic athletes of the Soviet Union
Athletes (track and field) at the 1952 Summer Olympics
Honoured Masters of Sport of the USSR